Judith Hörmann (born 1983) is a German sprint canoer who has competed since 2005. She won seven medals at the ICF Canoe Sprint World Championships with three golds (K-2 1000 m: 2007, K-4 200 m: 2005, K-4 500 m: 2005), two silvers (K-4 200 m and K-4 500 m: both 2006), and two bronzes (K-4 1000 m: 2005, 2007).

References

German female canoeists
Living people
1983 births
ICF Canoe Sprint World Championships medalists in kayak